The 1879 Ontario general election was the fourth general election held in the province of Ontario, Canada.  It was held on June 5, 1879, to elect the 88 members of the 4th Legislative Assembly ("MLAs").

The Ontario Liberal Party, led by Oliver Mowat, won a third term in government with a larger majority in the legislature.

The Ontario Conservative Party, led by William Ralph Meredith, continued to lose seats.

Results

See also
Politics of Ontario
List of Ontario political parties
Premier of Ontario
Leader of the Opposition (Ontario)

References

1879
1879 elections in Canada
1879 in Ontario
June 1879 events